College of Agriculture, Vellayani is one of the oldest Agriculture colleges in Kerala under Kerala Agricultural University and situated in Vellayani, Thiruvananthapuram. The campus is 2.52 sq km and bordered on three sides by Vellayani Lake.

Overview
The College of Agriculture, Vellayani was established in May, 1955. It is one of India's leading Centers of Undergraduate and Post Graduate education in Agriculture and Forestry. The institution was set up in a palace building belonging to the royal family of erstwhile Travancore.

Post graduate programmes were started in the college during 1962. M.Sc. (Ag.) and Ph.D. degrees were started during 1965.  The Kerala Agricultural University was established in 1972 and the College of Agriculture, Vellayani become the major constituent of the University.

The college introduced a 'trimester' system of teaching with `internal evaluation'. Now the teaching is done under a `semester system'. A developed College farm provides field facilities for giving adequate work experience for the students. The farm also helps the M.Sc. (Ag.) and the Ph.D. students for conducting researches. The under graduate level students are being trained in all aspects of the farm operations. Students raise all the important crops in small plots in the college farm under the `work experience' programme. They are given intensive field training in the Krishi Bhavans of the Department of Agriculture and in the Research Stations of the Kerala Agricultural University, where they get proper exposure to the practical problems in agriculture.

Gallery

References

External links

 Official website

Agricultural universities and colleges in Kerala
Universities and colleges in Thiruvananthapuram district
Educational institutions established in 1955
1955 establishments in India